Ahmed Shehda Abunamous (born 5 October 1999) is a Palestinian footballer who plays as a striker for Baniyas. He is known for his finishing and dribbling.

Club career
In the 2020–21 season, he scored his goal with a solo effort after dribbling past a four defenders in the 80th minute on 17 December 2020, coming on as a substitute in 77st minutes, in a 1–0 home win against champions Sharjah.

Career statistics

Club

Notes

References

External links

1999 births
Living people
Palestinian footballers
Palestinian expatriate footballers
Association football forwards
UAE Pro League players
Baniyas Club players
Expatriate footballers in the United Arab Emirates
Palestinian expatriate sportspeople in the United Arab Emirates